Cory Carpenter (born August 30, 1976) is an American speed skater. He competed in three events at the 1998 Winter Olympics.

References

External links
 

1976 births
Living people
American male speed skaters
Olympic speed skaters of the United States
Speed skaters at the 1998 Winter Olympics
Sportspeople from Kalamazoo, Michigan